Hand coolers can be traced back to the Victorian era and the 19th century in America.

This small, cooled, egg-shaped item originally made of porcelain, marble, glass or crystal and just slightly smaller than an actual egg would be nestled in the palms of Victorian ladies to ward off the possibility of the social humiliation of a wet, warm handshake.

Since extending one's hand was the common gesture for the invitation to dance, hand coolers became invaluable as during that time it was unacceptable for ladies to have hot, sweaty hands. In France during this time period, it was expected that a ladies' hand would be cool and dry when kissed in greeting by an admiring male. This simple fact was made all the more problematic by the fact that women wore layers upon layers of clothing as part of the Victorian fashions, trapping in body heat. One means of dealing with this problem was the hand cooler.

It was also believed that cooling one's hands would help ward off disease and prevent the common issue of fainting from wearing all those heavy clothes. Hand coolers have become one of the forgotten useful items that fall under the heading of Victorian decorative arts and now can only be found as recreations or at auction.

References 

Fashion accessories